The 2009–10 season was the 109th season in the existence of Stade Rennais F.C. and the club's 15th consecutive season in the top flight of French football. In addition to the domestic league, Angers participated in this season's edition of the Coupe de France and the Coupe de la Ligue. The season covered the period from 1 July 2009 to 30 June 2010.

Club

Coaching staff

Kit

Other information

Players

Squad information

Starting 11

Appearances and goals

Disciplinary records

Competitions

Overview

Ligue 1

League table

Results summary

Results by round

Matches

Coupe de France

Coupe de la Ligue

References

Rennes
Stade Rennais F.C. seasons